Pulau Melaka (Malacca Island) is a man-made island off the coast of the Malaysian state of Malacca. It is part of the  “Twin Island City Centre” project undertaken by Pulau Kembar Sdn Bhd (formerly Inno Enhance Sdn Bhd), a subsidiary of Talam Corporation Berhad. This waterfront development project involves the reclamation of two islands, approximately 0.5 km off the coast of Malacca City measuring 40ha and 50ha respectively. The reclamation of the first island of 40ha and a 30m bridge linking to the mainland had been completed. The Pulau Melaka development was planned to comprise a floating mosque, Malacca Straits Mosque; 4,387 units of residential and 4,180 units of mixed commercial development together with leisure-cum-tourism amenities such as marine theme park, marina, hotels and waterfront activities.

Infrastructures 
 Malacca Straits Mosque - A mosque built on top of columns above the water, with a lighthouse-like minaret, located on the southern shore of the island.

Cancelled development projects 
 Arab City Melaka
 Melaka Gateway

See also
 Geography of Malaysia
 List of islands of Malaysia

References

Islands of Malacca